Acacia clementii may refer to:
 Acacia pyrifolia (Acacia clementii Domin)
 Acacia xiphophylla (Acacia clementii Maiden & Blakely)